Sonny Stitt Plays Jimmy Giuffre Arrangements is an album by saxophonist Sonny Stitt performing music arranged by Jimmy Giuffre recorded in 1959 and originally released on the Verve label.

Reception

The Allmusic site awarded the album 4½ stars.

Track listing 
All compositions by Sonny Stitt except as indicated
 "New York Blues" (Jimmy Giuffre) - 3:56
 "Giuff" - 2:58
 "Laura" (David Raksin, Johnny Mercer) - 4:50
 "Sonny Boy" (Ray Henderson, Buddy De Sylva, Lew Brown) - 3:57
 "Down Country" (Stitt, Giuffre) - 6:57 
 "Singin' in the Rain" (Nacio Herb Brown, Arthur Freed) - 4:27
 "Uptown" - 5:21
 "Downtown" - 4:38
 "I Let a Song Go Out of My Heart" (Duke Ellington, Irving Mills, Henry Nemo, John Redmond) - 3:23
 "Two for Timbucktu" (Giuffre) - 3:20

Personnel
Sonny Stitt - alto saxophone, tenor saxophone
Jimmy Giuffre - tenor saxophone, arranger
Lee Katzman, Jack Sheldon - trumpet
Frank Rosolino - trombone
Al Pollen - tuba
Jimmy Rowles – piano
Buddy Clark – bass
Lawrence Marable - drums

References

1959 albums
Sonny Stitt albums
Verve Records albums